Two Waters may refer to:

 Two Waters, Hertfordshire, a district of Hemel Hempstead, Hertfordshire, England
 The Two Waters, 1988 Argentine drama film